Nicole Oude Luttikhuis (born 26 December 1997 Harbrinkhoek) is a Dutch volleyball player, who plays as an outside hitter/opposite. She was a member of the Netherlands women's national volleyball team.

Career 
She began her career in her hometown with VV Krekkers.
She joined Talent Team Papendal to Arnhem.
In the junior national team Oude Luttikhuis played international for the first time.
In 2015, Oude Luttikhuis moved to first division club Eurosped TVT Almelo.
With the club, she won the national cup in the 2015/16 season. She was nominated for the Ingrid Visser Prize as one of the best Dutch talents.

In 2016, she joined the German Bundesliga club Ladies in Black Aachen.
With the club, she reached the quarter-finals in the 2016/17 season in the Bundesliga play-offs and in the DVV Cup 2016/17.

She played with the Dutch National Team at the 2015 European Games in Baku, Azerbaijan, the 2017 FIVB Volleyball World Grand Prix. and 2017 Montreux Volley Masters

References

External links 

 
 
 
 

1997 births
Living people
Dutch women's volleyball players
European Games competitors for the Netherlands
People from Tubbergen
Wing spikers
Expatriate volleyball players in Germany
Dutch expatriate sportspeople in Germany
Sportspeople from Overijssel